Flers is a commune near the northern edge of the Somme department in Hauts-de-France in northern France.

It lies to the south of the D929 road, between Albert and Bapaume.

History
In 1916, the Battle of Flers–Courcelette saw the first use of the tank (the Mark I) in the field of battle.

Demography

See also
Communes of the Somme department

References

Communes of Somme (department)